The Smith Ministry is the combined Cabinet (formally the Executive Council of Alberta), chaired by 19th Premier of Alberta Danielle Smith, that has governed Alberta since October 11, 2022. The Cabinet consists of members of the United Conservative Party, which holds a majority of the seats in the Legislative Assembly of Alberta.

The Smith Ministry replaced the Kenney Ministry, following the 2022 United Conservative Party leadership election.

List of ministers

Cabinet composition 
Smith's inaugural cabinet was sworn in on October 21, 2022. It numbered 25 ministers, an increase from the Kenney Ministry's 20 members. Five of the six rivals that Smith faced for the leadership were included in cabinet: Travis Toews was named finance minister; Brian Jean was appointed to a revamped ministry of jobs, economy and northern development; Todd Loewen headed a newly combined ministry of forestry, parks and tourism; Rebecca Schulz gained municipal affairs; and Rajan Sawhney took the ministry of trade, immigration and multiculturalism. Leela Aheer, who placed seventh, did not join cabinet. Adriana LaGrange, Demetrios Nicolaides and Tyler Shandro retained their portfolios from the Kenney Ministry, while Tanya Fir, Whitney Issik, Ric McIver, Jason Nixon and Prasad Panda were dropped entirely. The labour and housing ministries were eliminated. The number of female cabinet ministers dropped from eight to five.

See also 
 Executive Council of Alberta
 List of Alberta provincial ministers

References

External links 
 Official website

Politics of Alberta
Executive Council of Alberta
2022 establishments in Alberta
Cabinets established in 2022
Ministries of Charles III
Current governments